Michael Malone is an Irish/Australian technology entrepreneur and business executive. He was the founder and managing director of the Perth-based telecommunications provider iinet starting the business in his parents' garage. He is a pioneer of dial up access back in 1993 before the Internet became mainstream. Over the years he has been an advocate for Internet consumer rights as well participating in the metadata debate. He was appointed as a non executive director of the NBNco in 2016.

Early life 
Malone was born in, County Clare, Ireland and migrated to Australia in 1978 with his parents and two brothers.

Education 
Malone attended Christian Brothers College Leederville (now Aranmore Catholic College). He has a Bachelor of Science in Mathematics and Post Graduate Diploma in Education from The University of Western Australia.

Business career 
Michael Malone and Michael O'Reilly founded iiNet in 1993, starting the business in a suburban garage in Perth, Western Australia as iiNet Technologies Pty Ltd. It began as one of the first Australian Internet Service Providers (ISPs) to offer TCP/IP Internet access, as opposed to the store-and-forward techniques (such as MHSnet) that were then in use at other ISPs. It claims it was the first ISP to offer PPP access in Australia, and to be the first to base operations on the then new Linux operating system.

The company outgrew its suburban home in 1995 and moved to Perth CBD office accommodation yet its early growth during the Internet boom was hampered by the ability of Telstra (not releasing Bigpond as an ISP until 1997) to cope with the demand of needed telephone lines, and by the sheer competitive pressure in the Perth market, which had a comparative oversupply of low-cost providers. In 1996, iiNet successfully expanded into the Adelaide market under the name light.iinet.net.au (named after Colonel Light), in partnership with locals John Lindsay and Leigh Hart.

iiNet listed on the Australia Stock Exchange in September 1999.

During his executive tenure at iiNet, Malone aggressively grew iiNet by acquiring other leading ISPs all over Australia. He grew the company to become the second largest ISP in Australia. He was also a passionate advocate for Internet consumer rights in regards to privacy as well contributing to the metadata debate.

Malone was a lead witness and spokesperson in the Roadshow Films Pty Ltd v iiNet Ltd 
copyright case that was successful in the High Court of Australia.

Malone stepped aside as managing director in early 2014 after taking a three-week holiday in Argentina which was supposed to be a three-month to six-month sabbatical. In 2015, iiNet was acquired by TPG Telecom.

Malone has served on the board of Seven West Media, SpeedCast, Superloop, Axicom, and Dreamscape Limited. He is the chairman of a Perth-based information security company Diamond Cyber.

He joined the board of NBN Co in 2016.

Malone was appointed to the board of ASX Listed logistics software company WiseTech Global. in 2020.

References 

Australian business executives
University of Western Australia alumni
Living people
1969 births
NBN Co people